Sir John Clinton, 7th Lord Clinton, KB (c. 1470 – 4 June 1514) was an English peer.  He was also known as John Fiennes.

Origins
John Clinton was born about 1470/71 in Folkestone, Kent. He was the son of Sir John Clinton, 6th Lord Clinton (c.1429 - 29 Feb 1487/88) and Elizabeth Fiennes.

Titles
John Clinton succeeded to the title of 7th Lord Clinton on 29 February 1487/88.

He was invested as a Knight, Order of the Bath (K.B.) on 14 November 1501.

Family
John Clinton married twice.  His first wife was Elizabeth Morgan, daughter of Sir John Morgan of Tredegar, Monmouthshire, Wales, whom he married before 1490.

His second wife was Anne West, daughter of Thomas West, 8th Baron de la Warr (d. 1525), whom he married before 1501.

Sir John died on 4 June 1514.

References

15th-century English nobility
1470s births
Year of birth uncertain
1514 deaths
Barons Clinton
16th-century English nobility
People from Folkestone